The Wilby Conspiracy is a 1975 British adventure thriller film directed by Ralph Nelson and starring Michael Caine, Sidney Poitier, and Nicol Williamson. Filmed in Kenya, it was written by Rodney Amateau, based on the 1972 novel by Peter Driscoll. It had a limited release in the US.

Plot
In apartheid-era South Africa, Shack Twala (played by Sidney Poitier), a black revolutionary who had served time on Robben Island, is freed by Rina van Niekerk (Prunella Gee), his Afrikaner defence attorney, because he would be a victim of retroactive legislation. Rina, estranged from her husband Blane (Rutger Hauer), is having a relationship with a British mining engineer, Jim Keogh (Michael Caine), who has attended Shack's trial.  Surprised by the verdict, Rina, Jim and Shack go off to celebrate at her house. They are stopped by policemen who are conducting identity document checks and arresting everyone who does not have their papers on them. As Shack has only just been released from prison he will not receive his papers until the next day. The policeman and Shack antagonise each other leading to Shack being handcuffed and arrested.  When Rina attempts to pull the policeman off Shack, the policeman hits her, knocking her to the ground. Jim assaults and knocks out the policeman making all three fugitives.

At a police station, a police brigadier (Patrick Allen) is chastised by the racist Major Horn (Nicol Williamson) of the Bureau of State Security (BOSS) for not only arresting Shack but continuing with their random identity checks and arrests that have infuriated world opinion.

The three fugitives are followed and monitored by BOSS to lead them to discover their escape route to Botswana and its facilitators, Indian dentists Anil Mukarjee and Persis Ray; a stash of stolen uncut diamonds being used to fund the Black Congress Party and its leader, a man named Wilby Xaba (Joe De Graft).

Shack learns that the diamonds are hidden at the bottom of a sinkhole. With Shack and Mukarjee's help, Jim retrieves the diamonds from the sinkhole, but Ray, wanting to use the diamonds to emigrate from South Africa, kills Mukarjee and attempts to rob them of the diamonds. Shack fights Ray to protect the diamonds, and in the commotion, she falls into the sinkhole and is killed. Diamonds in hand, they have arranged for Blane, a private pilot, to fly them out of the country, which he does after Rina blackmails him by threatening to make public his drug usage and relationships with black women, illegal in South Africa.

The three arrive at the South Africa–Botswana border, where the police, who were there waiting for them, give chase in jeeps. After evading them, they board Blane's aeroplane and are chased by South African Air Force aeroplanes over the border into Botswana. They manage to escape the pursuing aeroplanes and land on a makeshift runway and disembark, with Blane departing in his aeroplane. They make their way to one of the Black Congress Party's camps where they meet many villagers, Wilby Xaba, and armed guards. Suddenly, BOSS agents arrive in a commandeered lorry, kill the guards, and take Wilby prisoner, revealing that he was their real target all along and that the diamonds retrieved from the sinkhole were forgeries. As the BOSS agents attempt to escape with Wilby via helicopter, Shack and the villagers bring down and destroy the helicopter, kill the pilot and all the BOSS agents with the exception of Major Horn, and free Wilby. Horn is disarmed of his pistol and taken prisoner, where he gloats that he will be rescued by the South African Government and that he will continue to pursue them. Jim responds by killing Horn, shooting him with his own pistol.

Cast

DVD & HD
 The region 1 DVD was released 20 January 2004.
 In 2010 it was digitized in High Definition (1080i) and broadcast on MGM HD.

References

External links
 
 
 
 
 

1975 films
1970s thriller films
British thriller films
Apartheid films
Cold War films
Films based on British novels
Films directed by Ralph Nelson
Films shot at Pinewood Studios
Films scored by Stanley Myers
United Artists films
Films about racism
Films about race and ethnicity
Films set in Botswana
Films set in South Africa
Films shot in Kenya
Conspiracy
1970s English-language films
1970s British films